Born to Run is an album by Bruce Springsteen.

Born to Run may also refer to:

Literature
 Born to Run (autobiography), a 2016 book by Bruce Springsteen
 Born to Run: A Hidden Tribe, Superathletes, and the Greatest Race the World Has Never Seen, a 2009 book about the Tarahumara Indians by Christopher McDougall
 Born to Run, a 2008 novel by James Grippando
 Born to Run, a 2007 novel by Michael Morpurgo

Music
 "Born to Run" (Emmylou Harris song) (1982)
 "Born to Run" (Bruce Springsteen song)
 "Born to Run", a song by k-os from Atlantis: Hymns for Disco
 "Born to Run", a song by Lynyrd Skynyrd from The Last Rebel

Television and film
 Born to Run (TV series), a 1997 television marathon drama series
 "Born to Run" (Lost), a 2005 episode of Lost
 "Born to Run" (Terminator: The Sarah Connor Chronicles), a 2009 episode of Terminator: The Sarah Connor Chronicles
 Ride a Wild Pony or Born to Run, a 1975 Disney film